A pregnene is an alkene derivative of a pregnane.

An example is cortisone.

References

See also
 Pregnanes

Pregnanes